"Noche Buena" is a Tagalog-language Christmas song written by composer Felipe Padilla de León and lyricist Levi Celerio in 1965. As a Christmas standard, it has been recorded by numerous Filipino artists since its publication.

Recordings
Esso Philippines Choral Group, for the 1972 album Pasko sa Pilipinas
Didith Reyes, for the 1977 album Merry Christmas
Marco Sison, for the 1981 album Pamasko ng Mga Bituin
Celeste Legaspi, for the 1984 album Plakang Pamasko ni Celeste Legaspi
Joey Albert, for the 1987 album Maligayang Pasko
Ryan Cayabyab, for the 1991 album One Christmas
Dyna Ensemble, for the 1994 album Pasko Na Namang Muli
San Miguel Philharmonic Orchestra and the San Miguel Master Chorale, arranged by Ryan Cayabyab for the 2005 album Pasko I
The Company, for the 2006 album The Christmas Album

See also
List of Filipino Christmas carols

References

1965 songs
Christmas songs
Songs with lyrics by Levi Celerio
Songs with music by Felipe Padilla de León
Tagalog-language songs